The 2019 Mediterranean Athletics U23 Indoor Championships was an athletics competition which was held in Miramas, France, 19 January 2019. A total of 16 events were contested, of which 8 by male and 8 by female athletes.

Medal summary

Men

Women

Medal table

References

Mediterranean Athletics U23 Championships
Mediterranean Athletics U23 Indoor Championships
Mediterranean Athletics U23 Indoor Championships
International athletics competitions hosted by France
Mediterranean Athletics U23 Indoor